MOV was a Portuguese  basic cable and satellite television channel operated by Dreamia SLU, a joint venture between AMC Networks International Iberia and NOS. MOV was launched on December 1, 2007, by NOS, then Zon TV Cabo, and aired mainly TV series and movies. Later, Dreamia started a joint venture with AMC, in order to increase the channel's programming library, with new TV series and films.

On May 21, 2008, MOV did a major rebranding, including simulcasting in HD. Along with corporate sibling SportTV, MOV premiered idents, continuity and imagery produced by Red Bee Media.

The channel ended its broadcasts on March 31, 2017.

References

External links 
 MOV website

AMC Networks International
Mass media in Portugal
Television networks in Portugal
Defunct television channels in Portugal
Television channels and stations established in 2007
Television channels and stations disestablished in 2017
2007 establishments in Portugal
2017 disestablishments in Portugal